Madhabaliya is a town in Tilottama Municipality in Rupandehi District in Lumbini Province of southern Nepal. The formerly village development committee was merged to form a new municipality on 18 May 2014. At the time of the 1991 Nepal census it had a population of 8,380 people living in 528 individual households.

References

Populated places in Rupandehi District